Christian Talli (20 December 1917 – 1 February 2005) was a French swimmer who won a silver medal in the 4 × 200 m freestyle relay at the 1938 European Aquatics Championships. He finished fourth in the same event at the 1936 Summer Olympics. During his career he won five national freestyle titles.

References

1917 births
2005 deaths
Swimmers at the 1936 Summer Olympics
Olympic swimmers of France
French male freestyle swimmers
European Aquatics Championships medalists in swimming